Isotope electrochemistry is a field within electrochemistry concerned with various topics like electrochemical separation of isotopes, electrochemical estimation of isotopic exchange equilibrium constants, electrochemical kinetic isotope effect, electrochemical isotope sensors, etc.

It is an active domain of investigation. It overlaps with many other domains of both theoretical and practical importance like nuclear engineering, radiochemistry, electrochemical technology, geochemistry, sensors and instrumentation.

See also
Bioelectrochemical reactor
Concentration cell
Electrochemical cell
Electrochemical engineering
Equilibrium fractionation
Transient kinetic isotope fractionation

Notes

External links
electrochemical investigation using isotopic effects
http://hydrobor.com.tr/bilgi-bankasi/.../Ti%20Ni%20intermetallic%20phases.pdf
electrochemical isotope separation
electrochemical isotope cell
ACS radioelectrochemistry
electroplating isotope effects
JES electrochemical pumping isotope effects
electrochemical isotope fractionation
https://web.archive.org/web/20120319145651/http://wwwsoc.nii.ac.jp/aesj/publication/JNST2002/No.4/39_367-370.pdf
DOI.org
http://onlinelibrary.wiley.com/doi/10.1002/anie.196707571/abstract

Electrochemistry
Chemical engineering
Isotopes